Zdob și Zdub (onomatopoeic for the sound of a drum beat) is a Moldovan folk punk band, based in Chișinău. The band represented Moldova in the Eurovision Song Contest 2005 in Kyiv, Ukraine, on 21 May 2005, finishing 6th. They also represented Moldova in the Eurovision Song Contest 2011 in Düsseldorf, Germany, on 14 May 2011, finishing 12th, and represented Moldova again, in the Eurovision Song Contest 2022 in Turin, Italy, on 14 May 2022, finishing 7th. The band is often referred to by its fans as ZSZ. To date, Zdob si Zdub are the only artists to have qualified from a Eurovision Song Contest semi-final three times.

Band history

1994–1999
"Zdob și Zdub musical band was put together in 1994 in Moldova. Before that, the singer Roman Iagupov, the bass-player Mihai Gîncu and the drummer Anatol Pugaci had together attended a school in a small town from the suburbs of Chișinău, called Străşeni. They found the missing musicians during their studies at the Sports College in Chișinău. The line-up of the band was constantly changing: sometimes the band had two singers, sometimes - two guitarists. As a result, one guitarist became a singer, the clarinettist - a drummer, and the drummer - a bass-player.
In the spring of 1994, Roman Iagupov met the future producer of "Zdob și Zdub" - Igor Dînga, the singer of the seminal band "Cuibul". In June, the band got some attention from the music media in Chișinău, while playing before the "Cuibul" performance.
In November 1994, the first demo was recorded in a professional studio, and one song, "The Lost World" passed the selection of the "Learn To Swim I" Festival in Moscow, where the band appeared for the first time as "Zdob și Zdub". The band managed to immediately capture the attention and sympathies of Moscow extreme youth and made friends with the local alternative bands, especially with the "IFK", that accepted "Zdob și Zdub" invitation to play at the "10 Years After Chernobyl" Action in Chișinău.
1996
In July 1996, "Zdob și Zdub" participated at the "Learn to Swim II" Festival, where they played before the world-famous Rapcore band Rage Against the Machine. Two songs were recorded for the "Learn To Swim II" compilation: "V dome moiom" ("In My House") in Russian, and "Hardcore Moldovenesc" in Romanian. The second song has become an absolute hit, and it still is the "visit card" of the band. All national radio stations broadcast "Hardcore Moldovenesc", which became the hymn of the alternative youth in Moldova, being in the top of the hit parades. The same song was included in the "Romanian Underground" compilation in Romania, attracting attention due to the obvious Moldovan dialect.
At the end of 1996, as a result of the deal with the Russian label "FeeLee", "Zdob și Zdub" recorded their debut album "Hardcore Moldovenesc". The entire album is in Russian, with the exception of the title track.
1997
In January 1997, the band had an opening performance for Biohazard and Rollins Band in Moscow.
In March 1997, the band made a promotion tour with the Russian band "Tequilajazzz" in Moscow, St. Petersburg, and Chișinău.
In August 1997, "Zdob și Zdub" played at the "Kazantip" Festival in Crimea in front of thousands of people.
In October 1997, the band recorded 10 songs of the album "Hardcore Moldovenesc" in Romanian, for distribution in Romania.
In December 1997, "Zdob și Zdub" initiated the "Learn to Swim" Festival in Chișinău and invited the bands "Kirpitchi" from St. Petersburg and "Neurotica" from Timișoara (Banat, Romania).
1998
In 1998, "Zdob și Zdub" toured a lot, and at the end of the year had a two weeks tour in Germany. After that, "Zdob și Zdub" started to work on a new album, heading away from the American hardcore-concept, making more use of ethnic instruments, using them in the same extreme way, but with a more melodic, lyrical Moldovan touch. All the new songs are written in the Moldavian dialect of Romanian language. This was the beginning of a new stage: preparation for the recording of a new album under the name "Tabara Noastra". The album was recorded with the help of the famous Moldovan musicians, and, namely, Anatol Stefanet from "Trigon" (violin alt), Valeriu Cascaval from the folk music band "Barbu Lautaru" (dulcimer), and Eugen Didic from "Cuibul" (trumpet). The album consists of 12 songs, three of which are in Russian and the remaining in Romanian. Three songs have been recorded and submitted for promotion: "Draga Otee", an old hit of the well-known Moldovan musician Iurie Sadovni, the soulful ballad "Maria Blues", and "Zdubii Bateti Tare", resembling the Moldovan hardcore. After the debut and triumphal concert in Bucharest, "Zdob și Zdub" has shot its first video clip on the title-track "Zdubii Bateti Tare" at the Romanian music channel Atomic TV in Bucharest.
1999
In May 1999, "FeeLee" released the Russian version of the album "Zdubii Bateti Tare" under the name "Tabara Noastra".
The presentation of the new album "Tabara Noastra" took place in St. Petersburg on 26 May 1999, and in Moscow on 21–28 May, where the band had an opening performance for Soulfly (Max Cavalera, ex-Sepultura). On 14 August 1999, "Zdob și Zdub" was invited to one more unforgettable show in Moscow, the Russian MTV-Party, held on the Red Square. With other Russian bands, such as Gorky Park and "IFK", they opened the concert of Red Hot Chili Peppers. There were about 150.000 people watching this show live, and, probably, even more on the transmission on MTV-Russia.
On Christmas Eve, together with "Taraf de Tigani din Clejani", the band performed a concert at the legendary "Laptaria lui Enache" in Bucharest. Gypsy "Lautars" made a strong impression on Roman Yagupov. Their influence is felt in the next album "Agroromantica".

2000–2009
2000
In January 2000, the band was invited at the EuroSonic Festival in Groningen, the Netherlands. The performance was broadcast by 14 radio stations. There the band got acquainted with the director of Sziget festival Mr. Dan Panaitescu.
In August 2000, "Zdob și Zdub" played Pepsi Sziget Festival, sharing the same stage with the following stars of European and American music: Susanne Vega, Guano Apes, Lou Reed, Apollo 440, Bloodhound Gang, Therapy?, Oasis.
Also, in August 2000, "Zdob și Zdub" played at the "Nashestvie" Festival, held in Ramenskoe, Russia.
In September 2000, "Zdob și Zdub" participated at the Slavianski Bazaar Festival in Kyiv, Ukraine, together with "Ivan Kupala", "Lyapis Trubetskoi", and "Vopli Vidoplyasova" bands.
In October 2000, "Zdob și Zdub" recorded the cover version of the song "Videli Nochi", as a tribute to the legendary musical band "Kino" from St. Petersburg. The song became a hit, and won the 1st places in all mass-media charts and hit parades of the CIS countries for half a year. About 1.5 million copies of the album have been sold. "Zdob și Zdub" became the most touring band and received the prize of the "Fuzz" music-magazine (St. Petersburg) as the best CIS live group in Russia for 2000.
2001
On 31 January 2001, in Moscow, "Zdob și Zdub" played together with musician and film director Emir Kusturica and his "The No Smoking Orchestra".
On 9 May 2001, in Moscow, the "Zdob și Zdub" participated at a concert with the occasion of the Victory Day, performing the cover-version of the famous wartime song "Smugleanka-moldavanka". This song was recorded at the studio, entered many compilations and was sold in million copies.
On 19 May 2001, "Zdob și Zdub" played at one of the most prestigious Russian festivals - "Maxidrom" for the second time.
Regardless the tight concert schedule, from September 2000 until May 2001, the band had been working on its new album "Agroromantica", which was recorded and mixed at the "FM Division" Studio in Moscow. According to the musicians, the new album is a mixture of country romantics, fiery Balkan gipsy music, Moldovan folklore, and hardcore elements. This diversity could be called "music zdob".
7 September 2001 was the official date of presentation of the album "Agroromantica" in Moldova. On 7–21 September 2001, a grandiose tour on Moldova, called "Temporomantica", took place. 9 free concerts were performed in the biggest towns of the Republic.
The presentation of the album "Agroromantica" in Moscow took place on 12 October 2001, in the "B-2" club. The presentation of the album "Agroromantica" in Romania took place on 1 March 2002, in the overcrowded "Hanul lui Manuc".
In 2001, the band participated at some International Festivals: 5 July - "MUF + VOBAN 2001", Zrenjanin, Serbia; 19 July - "Tavriiskie Igri", Kahovka, Ukraine; 7 August - "PEPSI SZIGET 2001", Budapest, Hungary; 18 August - "ROCK'N'TOUL", Saint-George, Italy; 5 October - "Prosto Rock", Kyiv, Ukraine.
In 2001, the band performed more than 110 concerts in 34 cities and 7 countries. Also, in 2001, the band shot two video clips on the songs "Buna dimineata!" ("Good morning!") and "Tigan i OZN" ("Gypsy and the UFO").
2002
On 15 June 2002 was the participation to the MTV Romania opening in the "Lia Manoliu" stadium.
On 6 August 2002 was the participation to the "Krilya" rock music festival, on the Tushino aerodrome, Moscow, Russia.
On 25 August 2002 was the participation to the "Slavianskii Bazar" festival, Minsk, Belarus.
In October 2002 the band shot a video on Doina Haiducului song. It became the first video that was shot on 35-mm film in the band's history.
In November 2002 ZsZ invited Romanian gipsy orchestra "Yagalo" to Chișinău. Together they recorded 2 songs, which they were included into "450 Sheep" album. These were "Everybody in the Casa Mare", "Cuculetul" and the cover version of the Rolling Stones' "Paint it black".
On 14 October 2002 was the participation at the MTV European Music Awards ceremony in Barcelona. Zdob și Zdub was nominated at the "Best Romanian Act" section.
 In October 2002 ZsZ shot a video "Everybody in the Casa Mare" with the participation of gipsy singer from "Yagalo" orchestra Vasile Dinu (DJ Vasile), and in February 2003 Russian version of this song with Garik Sukachiov. Later the video with DJ Vasile won the first place in the top of Slovakian TV channel "Musicbox" the first place in the top-ten of MTV Romania.
At the end of 2002, the drummer Andrei Cebotari left the band. Mihai Gincu had to take the drums on himself and temporary Vadim Eremeev from Moscow "Nebo Zdes" band was invited to the place of a bass player.
2003
In February 2003 at a German independent label, TRIKONT came out a compilation "Russian Disco Hits", which became a bestseller in Germany. It included Russian version of "Gypsy and UFO" song.
On 5 June 2003 was the second award from MTV Romania in "Best Video" nomination for Doina Haiducului video.
On 23 August 2003 was HODOKVAS Festival, Modra, Slovakia and the beginning of negotiations with Warner Music Austria on the distribution of a new album on the territory of Europe.
On 5 July 2003, the band took part in "Krilia" festival in Tushino, Moscow, Russia. The performance was under threat of derangement, as there was an act of terrorism on the entrance to the festival, three woman terrorists blew up bombs on themselves. The Mayor of Moscow decided to continue the festival, as it was impossible to evacuate 70 000 people. The band performed 3 songs. One of the songs was the premiere of "Everybody in the casa mare" with Garik Sukachiov.
On 20 September 2003 was NOKIA TOTALBOARD FEST, Exhibition Center, Kyiv, Ukraine with 50 000 spectators.
On 24 November 2003 the next album "450 Sheep" came out. The first edition took place in Europe on Warner Music Austria. The first presentation of "450 Sheep" took place in Slovakia, where in December there took place a tour in support of the album around 5 cities of this Central European country. According to the reports of "Slovak Album Chart," the album "450 Sheep" became the first in the list of best selling albums of the foreign artists during the Christmas sales in December 2003.
On 18 December 2003 "450 Sheep" presentation took place in Bucharest (Romania). The show was broadcast live on the internet and Romanian TV channel TVR1.
2004
On 12 February 2004 in "Moscova" club "450 Sheep" album presentation took place in Chișinău. The house was full. The spectators were given a glass of wine and piece of brynza (traditional cheese) on the entrance. The show was shot by the National Television of Moldova.
In March 2004 after 7 years of absence the drummer Anatol Pugaci returned to the band. Mihai Gincu took up the bass again.
In March 2004 came out a new video of ZsZ on "DJ Vasile" track under the label of ZsZ. The gipsy MC Vasile ("Yagalo" orchestra) and Osoianu sisters (Moldavian folk group "Talancuta") took part in the shooting. Osoianu sisters recorded backing vocals for this song.
On 22 April 2004 ZsZ won the nomination "Best Ethno" on MTV Romanian Music Awards and received their 5th MTV statuette.
At the end of March 2004 with the participation of shooting crew of MTV Romania ZsZ shot video on "Nunta Extremala" song.
In June 2004 ZsZ with the album "450 Sheep" entered World Music Chart Europe on the 12th position. The songs from this album appeared in more than 20 European radio stations.
On 9 July "450 Sheep" released in Ukraine by Moon records, and on 27 July "CD Land records" releases it in Russia.
In summer 2004 Zdob și Zdub took part in following European festivals: Open Air Central Park, Lvov Ukraine, 27 June 2004; Tanz&Folk Festival, Rudolstadt, Germany. 4 July 2004; "Kraina Mrir" Ethno Festival, Kyiv, Ukraine, 10 July 2004; Rock la Mures Festival, Periam, Romania, 11 July 2004; Peninsula festival, Tirgul Mures, Romania, 29 July 2004; Muveszetek Volgye Festival, Pula, Hungary, 31 July 2004;  on 6 August 2004 ZsZ for the third time performed at the main stage of the biggest festival in Europe Sziget in Budapest (Hungary); OKEY Leto Festival, Slovakia, 7 August 2004; Hodokvas Festival, Slovakia, 20 August 2004; Vizovicke Trnkobrani, Visovice, Czech Republic, 21 August 2004.
In 10–15 August 2004, in the frames of a cultural-historic project "Following in the tracks of Geto-Dacians " a ZsZ tour supporting "450 Sheep" album in 5 towns of Moldova took place.
On 11 and 19 September 2004 ZsZ took part in "Snickers Urbania" in Kyiv and Kharkiv, Ukraine. More than 50 000 spectators were present.
On Sunday 10 October Ukrainian TV channel M1 showed a premier of ZsZ video clip "Nunta Extremala" (The Extreme Wedding) in its "Ministry of Premiers" program. This song appeared in 1999 in our second album "Tabara Noastra". It became one of the best songs of the band and is always performed in the ZsZ concerts. After 5 years ZsZ has re-recorded it with a new sound and arrangement.
In October 2004, the band was working in its studio on the recording of a new album dedicated to its 10th anniversary. The best 10 songs from the 10 years of creative work will enter the album and there will be 5 absolutely new tracks.
On 26 October 2004 the video clip "Nunta Extremala" reached the 1st place in Ukrainian "Enter" TV channel hit parade.
On 4 November 2004 in Saint-Petersburg ("Staryi Dom" Club) and 26 November in Moscow "B2" Club "Zdob și Zdub" will give performances promoting the album "450 Sheep". "Zdob și Zdub" have already toured Central and Eastern Europe with this album and won first places in TV and radio station's musical tops. The album appeared in Russia at the end of summer and contained 12 tracks, 3 of which are in Russian. The heading hit "Everybody in the casa mare" was recorded together with Garik Sukachyov.
On 17 December StarCHAT.ru project and internet-centers network "Cafemax" invited "Zdob și Zdub" to "Cafemax" on Novoslobodskaya.
Russian release of the album with a conceptual title "450 Sheep"; the 10th anniversary of the band to be celebrated in 2004 and the concert in Hard Rock Cafe Moscow on 16 December.
On 26 November 2004, the press-conference in Moscow, dedicated to "450 Sheep" album release, took place in the B-2 Club. The visitors were served with brynza – sheep's milk cheese as well as Moldovan wine. The Romanian folk music ensemble "Iagalo" was tuning up on the stage. ZsZ invited these Romanian Gypsy musicians for to reveal the concept and the spirit of "450 Sheep" album, and to make a presentation. New Year's Eve the Zdubs appeared in festive shows on TV different channels. The first shooting took part in Bratislava for Slovak channel TV Markíza, where "Everybody in the Casa Mare" song assumed one more original version. Instead of Gypsy MC Vasile the refrain was performed by Slovak folk ensemble "Bezanka" together with the show presenters Peter Marcin and Andy Kraus. In Moscow, the Zdubs took part in a telecast "The first night with Oleg Menshikov" on NTV Channel. ZsZ had specially prepared a cover version of "Costume" song from a classical Soviet movie "Magicians". Emmanuil Vitorgan, a famous Russian actor performed the vocals together with Roman.
On 18 December 2004, the shooting of the New Year's Eve show in Bucharest. Romanian version of this song Roman had recorded together with a famous talk-show presenter from ProTV. Her name is Teo.
On 14 December in Moscow "Smuglyanka", a song from a popular movie about the Second World War has been chosen for an alternative music show on RenTV. Producers were planning to invite Sofia Rotaru to take part in a recording of this song, but she could not do that because of a tight concert tour schedule. Then ZsZ decided to invite "Slivki" (Cream) pop girls-band. The shooting was scheduled for
As it was the previous time, the band met the New Year 2005 in the Romanian city of Iasi.
2005
On 18 January 2005, according to the German weekly MUSIKMARKT "ZDOB Si ZDUB" and 450 sheep was charted on place no. 38 in the annual charts for 2004, along with such ethnic music stars as Lhasa, Youssou N’Dour, Khaled, Sainkho Namchylak.
On 25 September 2005 Zdubs were invited to participate in Michael Palin's project documentary "New Europe" for BBC.
2006
On 14 July 2006 Zdubs opened the Roskilde Festival.
On 4 August 2006, the Zdubs’ gigantic productivity and the cosmic energy enable them to have an extra-full of shows and concerts program. It is not a wonder that this summer Zdubs were present at almost all the important festivals, beginning with Roskilde Festival (Denmark) and Peninsula (Romania) and recently ending with Krylia (Russia) and Staryi Melnik (Moldova).
On 20.10.2006, at 22:00, in Malersaal, Deutsches Schauspielhaus, Hamburg, Germany, Zdob și Zdub participated in the final public presentation "pictures from the East – relations docking tour 01". The "relations" docking tour focuses on seven cities where "relations" has engaged in an intensive exchange with cultural actors over the past four years: Chișinău, Sofia, Pristina, Sarajevo, Warsaw, Zagreb, and Ljubljana.
On 30 November 2006, the presentation concert of the new album Ethnomecanica took place in Romania, Bucharest.
2007
On 25 February 2007, in Trimedial CD Market, the band "Zdob și Zdub" met with their fans. "It is very important for the musicians to have the possibility to meet and communicate with the people that listen to their music, with those who respect them. Especially when it happens at home", Roman says.
On 18 March 2007, Austrian musician Hubert von Goisern, producer Wolfgang Spannberger and director-operator Markus Woolly, visited Moldova. The aims of their visit were to get acquainted with "Zdob și Zdub", to have some rehearsals with them, to go to the Moldovan part of the Danube. Wolfgang: "The brightest impressions – everything that happened in Zdub's dark rehearsal room. If we had more time for travelling around Moldova, we could have told you more. Anyway, everything was just great!"
On 24 April 2007, the website of the band "Zdob și Zdub" won the "Web Top.MD 2007" contest in two categories
On 15 May 2007, Zdob și Zdub were the guests of Rambler's "Blue Sofa".
The 18 May 2007 Zdubs participated in the "Full Contact" show on MTV Russia. On stage, they competed with the band "Neschasnyi sluchai".
22 June 2007 Linz Tour announced its beginning. This happened in Vienna (Austria), in the frame of the renowned DunauInselFest, on the stage of the not less renowned Austrian media company - company A1. Besides Hubert von Goisern, Willi Resetarits, Hohtraxlecker Sprungschanzen Musi (Bad Ischl) and Zdob și Zdub performed on the A1 stage.
On 23 June 2007 concert in Ismail, Ukraine. The stage in this city was put up in "Morvokzal" where, in the evening, Zdob și Zdub, Hubert von Goisern (Austria) and Gaydamaki (Ukraine) started the action.
On 1 July 2007, the Zdubs participated at B’estival, Romexpo, Bucharest, Romania.
On 28 July, the Zdubes participated in the "Staryi Melnik" Festival, Chișinău, Moldova.
On 29 July participated at the "Peninsula" Festival in Targu-Mures, Romania.
On 4–5 August, in Bacau (Romania) "Romanian Top Hits 2007" the band were nominated in the category "Rock Best Hit 2007", together with Directia 5, Animal X, Holograf and Voltaj.
On 17 August, the next concerts took place on the Romanian seaside in Costinesti and Vama Veche ("Stufstock Greenfest").
On 31 October "Zdob și Zdub" band was nominated by the Russian TV Channel A-ONE in four categories of the RAMP 2007 Awards - Rock Alternative Music Prize: "The Band of the Year", "The Video of the Year", "The Hit of the Year" and "The Album of the Year".
From 3 October till 6th 2007 Hubert von Goisern visited Chișinău to continue the recording of the new songs in collaboration with Zdob și Zdub. One song made in studio with Hubert was included in the European release of Ethnomecanica album.
For the fans, before the winter holidays, together with the Osoianu Sisters, the band recorded a Christmas carol "Sus, boieri, nu mai dormiti". It could be found on a special edition CD, which contained the best songs of Zdob și Zdub and was offered as a gift in the promotional winter packages Alocard 70 and Fantasy from Moldcell.
At the end of 2007, the Zdubish album "Ethnomecanica" was released at "Sojuz" Record Label, in Russia.
2008
On 6 March, the band took part in the show "Just tonight" on Channel TV Centre, Russia.
On 9 March, the Zdubes have participated in the show "5 songs on Channel 5" in Saint Petersburg with a live show.
On 28 March, the European release of the "Ethnomecanica" album took place in Germany, Switzerland and Austria, under the "Lawine Records", being distributed by Sony BMG.
The 5 April marked the starting point of the "Ethnomecanica" album's European release in cities from Hungary, Austria, Germany and Denmark such as in Budapest, Vienna, Innsbruck, Munich, Berlin, Hamburg, Koln, Dortmund and Copenhagen. The last concert in the framework of "Europe Tour 2008" was held in Chișinău on 29 April in the club Bier Platz.
On 16 April, the website of the band won the "Web Top.MD 2007" contest in two categories.
At midnight, towards 7 June, the "Zdob și Zdub" tour minibus was hit by a "Volkswagen Sharan" minivan causing the tour bus to roll over several times. As a result of this accident, 4 concerts were cancelled. According to the preliminary estimation, the total financial damage is around 50,000 Euro.
On 17 June the Moldavian Rockers held a "warm-up" show for the Romanian football fans, before the match Romania–Netherlands of UEFA Euro 2008. The concert took place on the Waisenhausplatz with the host city being Bern, Switzerland.
From the 7th till 11 July 2008 the adventure on Danube River of the Zdubes and Hubert von Goisern restarted in Ulm city, then in Karlsruhe, Rheinhafen.

2010–2019
2010
October 2010 brings an entirely Russian album, called "Beloe Vino / Krasnoe Vino" (from Russian – "White Wine / Red Wine"). At different times and on different occasions Zdob și Zdub recorded songs that on just as many grounds were not released. Now they are all gathered under one cover. The album includes features, the Russian version of some own songs, and cover versions of folklore and others’ songs.
The band's activity was appreciated by various TV channels (among them, MTV Europe), magazines, radio stations, thus enriching its collection of awards.
Their first Eurovision experience is Moldova's debut in the Contest, dating back to 2005. At the 50th edition, Zdob și Zdub represented their country with the song "Boonika Bate Doba", placed 6th in the Final.
"So Lucky" is the first single from their newest album which was produced by Marc Elsner and recorded in Berlin in 2010.  It is the result of the band's and producer's hard-work and creative quest. The exclusive new material, sung in English and Romanian, will be presented to the public in the near future. Zdob și Zdub will appear in a different light.
2011
In 2011, the citizens of the Republic of Moldova empowered them once again to rock the stage at the Eurovision Song Contest. Zdob și Zdub participated with the song "So Lucky", which came 12th in the Final of the European contest.
2012
In January, Zdob și Zdub released a new album in English under the German label Asphalt Tango Records, named Basta Mafia!.
For the first time in its career, the band worked with a foreign producer, namely Marc Elsner. The new album is the result of a very long and difficult creative process since it was recorded both at Headroom Studio in Germany, and Cuibul Studio in Chișinău. In February–March 2012 the band had played in the major cities of Austria, Hungary, Germany, Denmark and Switzerland as part of the European tour. There is also another version of the album, created especially for the Romanian speaking public. It was released in spring 2013 by MediaPro Music. The concert presentation of the new album in Romania took place on 12 April and was held in Hard Rock Cafe Bucharest.
On 21 May, in Eugène Ionesco Theatre Chișinău, Zdob și Zdub presented this version of the album to the public from Moldova, as part of a great show Moldovenii s-au născut, the title of the first single for which the band has already made a video. Furthermore, the band is planning to release the album Basta Mafia in Russia and Ukraine.
On 17 July, they played at the opening of the 27th Summer Universiade that took place in Kazan, Russia. On 10 November, the band hold a great concert in Montreal. This was the first time the band was playing in Canada.
In autumn, the band will celebrate its 20 years anniversary, by holding several great concerts in Republic of Moldova, Romania, Russia and Ukraine.
 On the eve of the winter holidays, on 18 December, Zdob și Zdub hold a unique concert along with a symphonic orchestra. The event was the result of a successful collaboration with a master in musical arrangements, Marc Osinski, who selected ten songs and adapted them for a symphonic orchestra. Further, the band is planning to release a DVD with the concert, entitled "Christmas Symphony".
Before the end of the year, under the guidance of the German producer Jan Rubach, the band recorded two songs: "La o margine de munte" and "Caloianul".
2015
In January, the band released the video for the song Om cu inimă de lemn, included in its latest album, Basta Mafia! (Romanian version).
On 5 and 6 June, they will hold two great concerts, at Moscow and Saint Petersburg. Both events are dedicated to the 15 years anniversary of the song "Videli Noch’" (the Zdob și Zdub version), performed for the first time at the KINOproby Festival Tribute Victor Tzoy. The song became very popular in the post-Soviet countries, won a lot of awards and continues to be performed at each concert of the band.

Eurovision

2005
On 26 February 2005, the band won a national pre-selection contest to claim the right to represent Moldova in its first ever appearance at the Eurovision Song Contest 2005, with their song "Boonika Bate Toba" ("Grandmamma is beating da drum-a").
On 19 May they performed fourth in the running order of the semi-final and ended up in 2nd place with 207 points. Qualifying for the grand final on 21 May, they drew starting position 7. After voting, they claimed 6th place with 148 points.

2011
In February 2011, the band once again won the right to represent Moldova in the Eurovision Song Contest 2011 held in Düsseldorf. The song they performed was So Lucky. The band performed in the second semi final on 12 May, in position 7. After voting they achieved 10th place with 54 points, qualifying them for the grand final on 14 May. They performed in the 15th position in the grand final and ended up in 12th place with 97 points at the end of voting. The song became the band's first and only to reach the UK Singles Chart, peaking at #153 on downloads alone.

2022
On 29 January 2022, their song "Trenulețul" was chosen by Teleradio-Moldova to represent the country at the Eurovision Song Contest 2022 in Turin after the planned national final, which the band was due to participate in with musicians Frații Advahov, was cancelled due to rising COVID-19 cases in Moldova. The group have ended up with 253 points, claiming the 7th place in the Grand Final.

Line-up
The following listing is by no means a comprehensive list of who has ever played in Zdob și Zdub. Early line-ups were very fluid, and many Moldovan musicians have been known to "sit in" for recording sessions or for individual concerts.

 Roman Iagupov (born 13 September 1973, Volgograd, Russia) – vocals, guitars, flute, ocarina, yorgaphone, turuiac, tartacuta, telinka, buhay, dramba, bagpipe, doba, lyricist (original member)
 Mihai Gîncu (born 5 March 1975, Străşeni, Moldova) – bass guitar, acoustic guitar, kobza, sitar, mandolin, organ, keyboards, mellotron, piano, accordion, percussion, backing vocals, composer, arranger, producer (original member)
 Sveatoslav Staruş (born 8 November 1976, Chişinău, Moldova) – guitar (1996 - 2004, 2010–present)
 Andrei Cebotari (born 4 August 1975, Soroca, Moldova) – drums (2000 - 2003, 2010–present)
 Victor Bîtca-Dandeș (born 3 April 1972, Chişinău, Moldova) – trombone, accordion, violin, kaval, flute, telinka, melodica (2001–present)
 Valeriu Mazîlu (born 12 September 1978, Chişinău, Moldova) – trumpet, bagpipe, flute (2001–present)

Former members
 Anatol Pugaci (born 6 October 1973, Chisinau, Moldova) – drums (original member; 1994–1997, February 2004 – May 2010)
 Igor Buzurniuc (born 23 June 1981, Soroca, Moldova) – guitar (January–June 2005, 2008 – May 2010)
 Serghei Vatavu (born 28 September 1967, Chisinau, Moldova) – guitar (May 2006 – 2008)
 Dimitri Kuharenco – vocals (1994–1995)
 Vitalii Kaceaniuc – drums (1998–2000)
 Serghei Cobzac – guitar (1994–1996)
 Serghei Pushnina – guitar (1996)
 Victor Cosparmac – guitar (April 2002 – December 2004)
 Vadim Bogdan – guitar (November 2005 – April 2006)
 Mihai Gincu – drums (January 2003 – January 2004)
 Pezza Butnaru – drums (January–March 2004)
 Alexandr Polenov – vocals, guitar (1991–1993)
 Valera Pugaci – flute (1991–1993)
 Vadim Eremeev – bass (January 2003 – February 2004)
 Eugen Didic – trumpet (January 1999 – September 2000)
 Ion Stavila – trumpet (September–December 2000)

Discography

Albums
 Hardcore Moldovenesc (Moldovan Hardcore) (1996)
 Tabăra Noastră (Our camp) (1999)
 Remixes (2000)
 Agroromantica (2001)
 450 De Oi (450 Sheep) (2003)
 Ethnomecanica (2006)
 Белое Вино/Красное вино (White Wine/Red Wine) (2010)
 Basta Mafia! (Stop Mafia!) (2012)
 20 De Veri (20 Summers) (2015)
 Bestiarium (2019)

Singles
"Boonika bate doba" (2005)
"So Lucky" (2011)

Participation in compilation albums
Budzma! Tuzin. Perazagruzka-2 (2011), track "Стоп-мафія"

References

External links

 Zdob și Zdub official page (in English, Romanian, and Russian)
 LiveJournal (only in Russian)

Musical groups established in 1994
1994 establishments in Moldova
Eurovision Song Contest entrants for Moldova
Eurovision Song Contest entrants of 2005
Eurovision Song Contest entrants of 2011
Moldovan rock music groups
Pop-folk music groups
Eurovision Song Contest entrants of 2022